Louise Parks (born 1945) is an American painter. She holds a Bachelor of Fine Arts degree from the Pratt Institute, and a Master of Fine Arts degree from Hunter College.  Her work has been seen in numerous group and solo exhibitions, including Afro-American Artists: New York and Boston at the Museum of the National Center of Afro-American Artists in 1970. She has also been active as a curator, working with Milton Brown on a show of the work of Jacob Lawrence at the Whitney Museum of American Art in 1974.

References

1945 births
Living people
African-American women artists
20th-century American painters
20th-century American women artists
21st-century American painters
21st-century American women artists
Pratt Institute alumni
Hunter College alumni
20th-century African-American women
20th-century African-American people
20th-century African-American painters
21st-century African-American women
21st-century African-American artists
American women curators
American curators